The Gymnotiformes  are an order of teleost bony fishes commonly known as Neotropical knifefish or South American knifefish. They have long bodies and swim using undulations of their elongated anal fin. Found almost exclusively in fresh water (the only exceptions are species that occasionally may visit brackish water to feed), these mostly nocturnal fish are capable of producing electric fields to detect prey, for navigation, communication, and, in the case of the electric eel (Electrophorus electricus), attack and defense. A few species are familiar to the aquarium trade, such as the black ghost knifefish (Apteronotus albifrons), the glass knifefish (Eigenmannia virescens), and the banded knifefish (Gymnotus carapo).

Description

Anatomy and locomotion 

Aside from the electric eel (Electrophorus electricus), Gymnotiformes are slender fish with narrow bodies and tapering tails, hence the common name of "knifefishes". They have neither pelvic fins nor dorsal fins, but do possess greatly elongated anal fins that stretch along almost the entire underside of their bodies. The fish swim by rippling this fin, keeping their bodies rigid. This means of propulsion allows them to move backwards as easily as they move forward.

The knifefish has approximately one hundred and fifty fin rays along its ribbon-fin. These individual fin rays can be curved nearly twice the maximum recorded curvature for ray-finned fish fin rays during locomotion. These fin rays are curved into the direction of motion, indicating that the knifefish has active control of the fin ray curvature, and that this curvature is not the result of passive bending due to fluid loading.

Different wave patterns produced along the length of the elongated anal fin allow for various forms of thrust. The wave motion of the fin resembles traveling sinusoidal waves. A forward traveling wave can be associated with forward motion, while a wave in the reverse direction produces thrust in the opposite direction. This undulating motion of the fin produced a system of linked vortex tubes that were produced along the bottom edge of the fin. A jet was produced at an angle to the fin that was directly related to the vortex tubes, and this jet provides propulsion that moves the fish forward. The wave motion of the fin is similar to that of other marine creatures, such as the undulation of the body of an eel, however the wake vortex produced by the knifefish was found to be a reverse Kármán vortex. This type of vortex is also produced by some fish, such as trout, through the oscillations of their caudal fins. The speed at which the fish moved through the water had no correlation to the amplitude of its undulations, however it was directly related to the frequency of the waves generated.

Studies have shown that the natural angle between the body of the knifefish and its fin is essential for efficient forward motion, for if the anal fin was located directly underneath, then an upwards force would be generated with forward thrust, which would require an additional downwards force in order to maintain neutral buoyancy. A combination of forward and reverse wave patterns, which meet towards the center of the anal fin, produce a heave force allowing for hovering, or upwards movement.

The ghost knifefish can vary the undulation of the waves, as well as the angle of attack of the fin to achieve various directional changes. The pectoral fins of these fishes can help to control roll and pitch control. By rolling they can generate a vertical thrust to quickly, and efficiently, ambush their prey. The forward movement is determined exclusively by the ribbon fins and the contribution of the pectoral fins for forward movement was negligible. The body is kept relatively rigid and there is very little motion of the center of mass motion during locomotion compared to the body size of the fish.

The caudal fin is absent, or in the apteronotids, greatly reduced. The gill opening is restricted. The anal opening is under the head or the pectoral fins.

Electroreception and electrogenesis 

These fish possess electric organs that allow them to produce electric fields, which are usually weak. In most gymnotiforms, the electric organs are derived from muscle cells. However, adult apteronotids are one exception, as theirs are derived from nerve cells (spinal electromotor neurons). In gymnotiforms, the electric organ discharge may be continuous or pulsed. If continuous, it is generated day and night throughout the entire life of the individual. Certain aspects of the electric signal are unique to each species, especially a combination of the pulse waveform, duration, amplitude, phase and frequency.

The electric organs of most Gymnotiformes produce tiny discharges of just a few millivolts, far too weak to cause any harm to other fish. Instead, they are used to help navigate the environment, including locating the bottom-dwelling invertebrates that compose their diets. They may also be used to send signals between fish of the same species. In addition to this low-level field, the electric eel also has the capability to produce much more powerful discharges to stun prey.

Taxonomy

There are currently about 250 valid gymnotiform species in 34 genera and five families, with many additional species yet to be formally described. The actual number of species in the wild is unknown. Gymnotiformes is thought to be the sister group to the Siluriformes from which they diverged in the Cretaceous period (about 120 million years ago). The families have traditionally been classified over suborders and superfamilies as below.

Order Gymnotiformes
 Suborder Gymnotoidei
 Family Gymnotidae (banded knifefishes and electric eels)
 Suborder Sternopygoidei
 Superfamily Rhamphichthyoidea
 Family Rhamphichthyidae (sand knifefishes)
 Family Hypopomidae (bluntnose knifefishes)
 Superfamily Apteronotoidea
 Family Sternopygidae (glass and rat-tail knifefishes)
 Family Apteronotidae (ghost knifefishes)

Phylogeny 

Most gymnotiforms are weakly electric, capable of active electrolocation but not of delivering shocks. The electric eels, genus Electrophorus, are strongly electric, and are not closely related to the Anguilliformes, the true eels. Their relationships were analysed by sequencing their mitochondrial genomes in 2019. This shows that contrary to earlier ideas, the Apteronotidae and Sternopygidae are not sister taxa, and that the Gymnotidae are deeply nested among the other families.

Actively electrolocating fish are marked on the phylogenetic tree with a small yellow lightning flash . Fish able to deliver electric shocks are marked with a red lightning flash . There are other electric fishes in other families (not shown).

Distribution and habitat
Gymnotiform fishes inhabit freshwater rivers and streams throughout the humid Neotropics, ranging from southern Mexico to northern Argentina. They are nocturnal fishes. The families Gymnotidae and Hypopomidae are most diverse (numbers of species) and abundant (numbers of individuals) in small nonfloodplain streams and rivers, and in floodplain "floating meadows" of aquatic macrophytes (e.g., Eichornium, the Amazonian water hyacinth). Apteronotidae and Sternopygidae are most diverse and abundant in large rivers. Species of Rhamphichthyidae are moderately diverse in all these habitat types.

Evolution

Gymnotiformes are among the more derived members of Ostariophysi, a lineage of primary freshwater fishes. The only known fossils are from the Miocene about 7 million years ago (Mya) of Bolivia.

Gymnotiformes has no extant species in Africa. This may be because they did not spread into Africa before South America and Africa split, or it may be that they were out-competed by Mormyridae, which are similar in that they also use electrolocation.

Approximately 150 Mya, the ancestor to modern-day Gymnotiformes and Siluriformes were estimated to have convergently evolved ampullary receptors, allowing for passive electroreceptive capabilities. As this characteristic occurred after the prior loss of electroreception among the subclass Neopterygii after having been present in the common ancestor of vertebrates, the ampullary receptors of Gymnotiformes are not homologous with those of other jawed non-teleost species, such as chondricthyans. 

Gymnotiformes and Mormyridae have developed their electric organs and electrosensory systems (ESSs) through convergent evolution. As Arnegard et al. (2005) and Albert and Crampton (2005) show, their last common ancestor was roughly 140 to 208 Mya, and at this time they did not possess ESSs. Each species of Mormyrus (family: Mormyridae) and Gymnotus (family: Gymnotidae) have evolved a unique waveform that allows the individual fish to identify between species, genders, individuals and even between mates with better fitness levels. The differences include the direction of the initial phase of the wave (positive or negative, which correlates to the direction of the current through the electrocytes in the electric organ), the amplitude of the wave, the frequency of the wave, and the number of phases of the wave.

One significant force driving this evolution is predation. The most common predators of Gymnotiformes include the closely related Siluriformes (catfish), as well as predation within families (E. electricus is one of the largest predators of Gymnotus). These predators sense electric fields, but only at low frequencies, thus certain species of Gymnotiformes, such as those in Gymnotus, have shifted the frequency of their signals so they can be effectively invisible.

Sexual selection is another driving force with an unusual influence, in that females exhibit preference for males with low-frequency signals (which are more easily detected by predators), but most males exhibit this frequency only intermittently. Females prefer males with low-frequency signals because they indicate a higher fitness of the male. Since these low-frequency signals are more conspicuous to predators, the emitting of such signals by males shows that they are capable of evading predation. Therefore, the production of low-frequency signals is under competing evolutionary forces: it is selected against due to the eavesdropping of electric predators, but is favored by sexual selection due to its attractiveness to females. Females also prefer males with longer pulses, also energetically expensive, and large tail lengths. These signs indicate some ability to exploit resources, thus indicating better lifetime reproductive success.

Genetic drift is also a factor contributing to the diversity of electric signals observed in Gymnotiformes. Reduced gene flow due to geographical barriers has led to vast differences signal morphology in different streams and drainages.

See also

 Electric fish
 Gymnarchus, the African knife-fish (Mormyroidea)

References

External links
 Photos of various gymnotiforms

 
Electroreceptive animals
Extant Late Jurassic first appearances
Ray-finned fish orders